Carlos Jorge Camacho Dantas (born 8 November 1966), known as Carlos Jorge, is a Portuguese retired footballer who played as a central defender.

Over the course of 15 seasons he amassed Primeira Liga totals of 316 games and 21 goals, for Marítimo and Sporting.

Football career
Born in Funchal, Madeira, Carlos Jorge arrived in C.S. Marítimo's youth system at the age of 16, making his first-team and Primeira Liga debuts two years later. After a one-year loan to C.F. União in the second division, also in the island, he returned to become an essential defensive unit, amassing 120 league appearances in four seasons (with nine goals); in the 1990–91 campaign, as his side finished tenth – the top level in Portugal then comprised 20 teams – he played all 38 games and minutes, scoring a career-best five goals.

In 1992, Carlos Jorge signed with Sporting Clube de Portugal, but appeared sparingly over the course of two seasons. He then returned to the Verde-rubros, playing a further seven years always in the top flight; in 1997–98 the everpresent team captain scored four in 30 matches as Marítimo qualified for the UEFA Cup, where they would exit in the first round against Leeds United (on penalties).

Carlos Jorge begun his manager career in 2009, acting as assistant coach to both the first and second teams of his main club.

References

External links

1966 births
Living people
Sportspeople from Funchal
Portuguese footballers
Madeiran footballers
Association football defenders
Primeira Liga players
Liga Portugal 2 players
C.S. Marítimo players
C.F. União players
Sporting CP footballers
Portugal under-21 international footballers